Ahmed Fahour  (born 1966) is a Lebanese Australian businessman. He is the managing director (MD) and CEO of Latitude Financial Services, and was formerly MD and CEO of Australia Post, and CEO Australia of the National Australia Bank (NAB).

Early life and career 
Fahour was born in Lebanon in 1966 and migrated to Australia with his parents, Abdel and Siham, in 1969. His parents became successful businesspeople in Australia and have eight children.

He studied at St Joseph's College in North Fitzroy and later attended Redden College in Preston. In 1987, he graduated from La Trobe University in Melbourne with a bachelor's degree of Economics. He went on to complete a Master of Business Administration at Melbourne Business School in 1993 while working for Boston Consulting Group. He became a director of the group in 1997, and spent a year as co-managing director of its joint-venture investment company, Iformation.

Fahour joined NAB in September 2004 as CEO Australia, and became an executive member of the board. In February 2009, he stepped down from the principal board and group executive committee. Fahour has held directorships of Nasdaq Dubai, Rip Curl and has been a trustee of the Melbourne Cricket Ground. He was invited by the Prime Minister and Treasurer to be the interim CEO of the Australian Business Investment Partnership.

Australia Post 
In December 2009, Fahour was announced as the new MD and CEO of Australia Post (a federal government-owned business), commencing in February 2010. There, he commenced a business renewal program, called "Future Ready". The program involved the implementation of a more customer-focused business model designed to capitalise on Australia Post's reputation as a trusted services provider.

Under Fahour's direction, Australia Post had two consecutive years of profit growth (in FY2011 and FY2012) following steep profit declines in the preceding two years (FY2009 and FY2010), as Australian letter volumes started to decline.  Further letter volume decline led to reduced profits in FY2013 and FY2014, with repeated calls from Fahour for the government to support fundamental reform of the letter service to prevent Australia Post incurring future losses.

In March 2012, Fahour announced plans to create the "Australia Post Digital MailBox", as part of the postal corporation's strategy "to build a sustainable communications business, both physically and digitally". The Digital MailBox was given a soft launch at Parliament House, Canberra, in October 2012 and it was officially opened to Australian consumers for the first time in May 2013.

In June 2014, Fahour was widely criticised for his $4.8 million salary, whilst sacking 900 staff. He was once Australia's highest-paid public servant, receiving a total salary package of $5.6 million (including a $1.2 million bonus) in 2016.

Under Fahour's leadership, in 2015 Australia Post recorded its first full-year loss in over 30 years, with half-year profits down some 56 percent.

In February 2017, Australian Prime Minister Malcolm Turnbull criticised Fahour's $5.6 million salary saying, "As the Prime Minister and a taxpayer, I've spoken to the chairman today. I think that salary, that remuneration, is too high." On 23 February, Australia Post announced that Fahour has resigned as MD and CEO of Australia Post, and would step down from the role in July 2017.

Upon resigning from CEO of Australia Post, in July 2017 Fahour joined BCG Digital Ventures as non-executive chairman for Asia-Pacific.

Later career
In 2011, Fahour was appointed the Australian Government's special envoy to the Organisation of Islamic Cooperation.

In 2014, Fahour was appointed chairman of Pro-Pac Packaging Group (PPG). The same year he was appointed an adjunct professor at La Trobe Business School and became a fellow of the Australian Institute of Company Directors. In 2017 Fahour was appointed an Officer of the Order of Australia for distinguished service to business, particularly in the area of postal communications, to the banking and investment sectors, and as a supporter of improved multicultural relations.

In October 2018, Fahour was appointed MD and CEO of Latitude Financial Services.

Views on extremism
Fahour says the best way to counter Islamic extremism is to give Muslim young people jobs and opportunities. He says that extremists misinterpret Islamic teachings such as the Quranic injunction, 'whoever kills an innocent person, it's as if he has killed all of mankind'.

Personal life
Fahour lives in Hawthorn, Melbourne, in a house that he bought in 2013 from Globe International co-founder Peter Hill for $20 million. The house was originally built for Sir James Frederick Palmer, the first Speaker of the Victorian Legislative Council and was later owned by the comic and entrepreneur George Coppin, before becoming a private school.

Fahour and his family have made significant financial contributions to the Islamic Museum of Australia, the founder and director of which is his brother, Moustafa Fahour, a former Macquarie Bank executive. His sister, MasterChef participant Samira El Khafir, is the head chef and manages the cafe on site. Moustafa's wife, Maysaa, is the chairwoman and director.

Fahour was married to Dionnie and has four children. He has four brothers and three sisters.

References 

1966 births
Australian people of Lebanese descent
Australian chief executives
Australian public servants
Officers of the Order of Australia
Australian Muslims
Boston Consulting Group people
Citigroup people
La Trobe University alumni
University of Melbourne alumni
Living people
Fellows of the Australian Institute of Company Directors